Silye is a surname. Notable people with the surname include:

 Erik Silye (born 1996), Hungarian footballer
 Jim Silye (born 1946), Canadian politician and former football player

See also
 Sille (given name)